The Inuit (sometimes referred to as Eskimo) are a group of culturally similar indigenous peoples inhabiting the Arctic regions of  Alaska (United States), Greenland (Kingdom of Denmark), the Northwest Territories, Nunavut, Nunavik (Quebec) and Nunatsiavut (Labrador), Canada. The list has been broken down by country:

List of American Inuit
List of Canadian Inuit
List of Greenlandic Inuit

Lists of indigenous people of the Americas
Lists of people by ethnicity